The Elk Township School District is a community public school district that serves students in pre-kindergarten through sixth grade from Elk Township, in Gloucester County, New Jersey, United States.

As of the 2019–20 school year, the district, comprised of one school, had an enrollment of 327 students and 31.7 classroom teachers (on an FTE basis), for a student–teacher ratio of 10.3:1.

The district is classified by the New Jersey Department of Education as being in District Factor Group "B", the second lowest of eight groupings. District Factor Groups organize districts statewide to allow comparison by common socioeconomic characteristics of the local districts. From lowest socioeconomic status to highest, the categories are A, B, CD, DE, FG, GH, I, and J.

For seventh through twelfth grades, public school students attend the Delsea Regional School District, which serves students from both Elk Township and Franklin Township. Students from Newfield attend the district as part of a sending/receiving relationship begun in September 2010 after Newfield ended its prior relationship with the Buena Regional School District. Schools in the district (with 2019–20 enrollment data from the National Center for Education Statistics) are 
Delsea Regional Middle School with 540 students in grades 7 and 8, and 
Delsea Regional High School with 1,028 students in grades 9–12.

History
Aura School was built in 1927 and rededicated in 1949 after a fire the previous year, with the newest addition built in 2002.

The New Jersey Department of Education has considered a vote by the Board of Education of the Franklin Township Public Schools in June 2010 requesting that the district withdraw from the Delsea Regional School District, which would require that the Delsea region be dissolved as about 80% of the regional district's students come from Franklin. With the withdrawal of Franklin Township, the two options to consider were to have Franklin and Elk Townships create a new regional district with Newfield students attending on a send-receive basis, or to have Franklin Township establish its own PreK-12 district which would receive students from both Elk Township and Newfield.

School
Aura School had an enrollment of 311 students in grades PreK-6 as of the 2019–20 school year.
Wayne Murschell, Principal

Administration
Core members of the district's administration are:
Dr. Piera Gravenor, Superintendent
Joseph Collins, Business Administrator / Board Secretary

Board of education
The district's board of education is comprised of nine members who set policy and oversee the fiscal and educational operation of the district through its administration. As a Type II school district, the board's trustees are elected directly by voters to serve three-year terms of office on a staggered basis, with three seats up for election each year held (since 2012) as part of the November general election. The board appoints a superintendent to oversee the day-to-day operation of the district.

Elk Township's Board of Education members include President J. Wilson Hughes Jr., Angelique Stoney-Siplin, Jennifer Wirtz, Danielle Bland, Cheryl Potter, Mary Snively, Courtney Vance, and Wayne Howard.

References

External links
Elk Township School District

School Data for the Elk Township School District, National Center for Education Statistics
Delsea Regional School District

School Data for the Delsea Regional School District, National Center for Education Statistics

Elk Township, New Jersey
New Jersey District Factor Group B
School districts in Gloucester County, New Jersey
Public elementary schools in New Jersey